Ischnocampa rubrosignata is a moth of the family Erebidae. It was described by Reich in 1936. It is found in Colombia.

References

Ischnocampa
Moths described in 1936